Andre Le Gal (1946-2013) was a French writer. He wrote around a dozen novels, among which are Le Shangaïé, winner of the Prix Maison de la Presse, and Ensemble de ses travaux, winner of the Prix Amic, awarded by the Academie Francaise.

He was also awarded Citoyen d'honneur by the town of Saint-Malo.

References

Awards
 1986 : Prix des Maisons de la presse for Le Shangaïé
 1990 : Prix Breizh for Le roi des chiens
 1998 : Prix Amic de l'Académie française for L'ensemble de ses travaux

Works
 1986 : Le Shangaïé
 1990 : Le Roi des chiens
 1991 : L'Or des sables
 1992 : Hawaï
 1993 : Au caprice des esprits
 1994 : Les Cœurs marins
 1998 : Chroniques des gens de mer
 1998 : Les Années fantômes
 2002 : Saigon
 2004 : Le Dernier Mandarin
 2007 : Les Sœurs de Saint-Pétersbourg

References

French writers

1946 births
2013 deaths